Bolletjes Blues (Gangsta Blues, also known as  Bling!) is a 2006 Dutch musical film with Negativ as the main character, Spike.

Plot

Spike is a young black man from Suriname who lives in the Bijlmermeer. He is a student first, but drops out. In order to have enough money to impress his white girlfriend Rosalie (Sophie van Oers) he joins a gang led by Delano (SugaCane) and commits various robberies.

A related gang operates a cocaine smuggling route from Suriname to the Netherlands with mules swallowing cocaine pellets. As a mule, Spike is arrested on departure from Johan Adolf Pengel International Airport (Zanderij) near Paramaribo, and incarcerated at Santo Boma prison.

Rosalie volunteers as mule also, in order to be able to visit Spike. The film ends after this visit, it does not show whether she actually swallows and smuggles cocaine pellets.

Cast
 Negativ as	Spike
 Sophie van Oers as	Rosalie
 SugaCane as Delano
 Raymzter as Musu
 Mr. Probz as Jimmy
 Adigun Arnaud as Shed Block Thug
 Kimo as Fred
 Derenzo Sumter as Melvin
 Goldie as Zamira
 Salah Edin as Abid Tounssi
 MC Aldrin as Beatboxer
 Verginia Olijfveld as Tante Jennifer
 Reina Linger as Manuela
 Mike Reus as Meester Kees
 Glenn Durfort as Ome edje

Reception
CineMagazine rated the film 2 stars.

VPRO Cinema rated the film 3 stars.

References

External links
 

Dutch musical films
2006 films
2000s musical films